Paşamezrası is a village in the Adıyaman District, Adıyaman Province, Turkey. The village is populated by Kurds of the Reşwan tribe and had a population of 202 in 2021.

References

Villages in Adıyaman District

Kurdish settlements in Adıyaman Province